El Diablo is the fourth studio album from Italian rock band Litfiba. It introduces a more rock sounding in the band's music, which used to be much more new wave influenced until there.  It is the first chapter of the "Tetralogy of elements" and it is dedicated to fire.

Track listing
"El Diablo"  – 4:26
"Proibito"  – 3:49
"Il volo"  – 4:22
"Siamo umani"  – 4:09
"Woda Woda"  – 5:04
"Ragazzo"  – 4:42
"Gioconda"  – 5:08
"Resisti"  – 4:50

Personnel
Piero Pelù - Vocals
Ghigo Renzulli - Guitars
Daniele Trambusti - Drums
Antonio Aiazzi – Keyboards
Roberto Terzani - Bass
Candelo Cabezas - Percussions

Recorded by Fabrizio Simoncioni
Produced by Alberto Pirelli

Certifications

References

Litfiba albums
EMI Records albums
1990 albums
Italian-language albums